Christian Brothers University is a private Roman Catholic university in Memphis, Tennessee. It was founded in 1871 by the De La Salle Christian Brothers, a Catholic teaching order.

History 

A Christian Brothers college was established in Pass Christian. It was in the former Pass Christian Hotel building. Alexander Dimitry was a professor at it. It burned in 1877.

Founded on November 19, 1871, it was established by members of the Institute of the Brothers of the Christian Schools, a Roman Catholic religious order founded by St. John Baptist de la Salle, the patron saint of teachers. At foundation the educational institution was named Christian Brothers College which was changed to Christian Brothers University when the school became a university in June 1990.

Founding 
Christian Brothers awarded the first post-secondary degree in the city in 1875. LeMoyne College (one of the two constituent parts of present-day LeMoyne-Owen College) has a founding year of 1871, but it was an elementary and secondary school at the time. The city's largest university, the University of Memphis, was not founded until 1912. Although Rhodes College was founded in 1848, it did not move from Clarksville, Tennessee to Memphis until 1925.

Brother Maurelian was appointed the first president. His three terms as president totalled 31 years.

Lasallian tradition 
Christian Brothers University traces its origins to priest and educational innovator, St. John Baptist de la Salle. De la Salle began a system of Christian schools in which teachers assist parents in the educational, ethical, and religious formation of their children. To continue his spiritual and pedagogical vision, de la Salle founded the Institute of the Brothers of the Christian Schools, known today as the De La Salle Christian Brothers.

Academics

Schools 
The university has four schools:
 Gadomski School of Engineering
 Rosa Deal School of Arts
 School of Business
 School of Sciences

Accreditation 
The university is accredited by the Southern Association of Colleges and Schools. The university's education department is accredited by the Council for the Accreditation of Educator Preparation (CAEP) but is on probation, and is in danger of completely losing accreditation within 2 years.

Study abroad 
As a member of the Lasallian Consortium, i.e. the seven Lasallian universities in the United States, CBU offers study abroad semesters in Australia, Brazil, China, England, France, Ireland, Italy, Mexico, South Africa, and Spain.

Facilities

Campus 
Christian Brothers University is located on a  wooded campus in the heart of Midtown, Memphis, four miles (6 km) east of Downtown. It is across from the Memphis Fairgrounds, home of the Simmons Bank Liberty Stadium, and diagonally positioned from the Cooper-Young Neighborhood.

The first building on campus, Kenrick Hall, constructed in 1939 as the original Christian Brothers High School, was demolished in 2015 to make room for the Rosa Deal School of Arts, set to open in January 2017. In 2021, CBU installed a manufactured building, which houses the nursing program. The campus includes the Rosa Deal School of Arts, Cooper Wilson Sciences Building, and the Benilde Hall Engineering Lab, which is currently being expanded, as well as sports facilities for basketball, volleyball, soccer, baseball, and softball.

The university's architecture follows the Georgian style popular at the time of the campus' relocation to East Parkway. Arch-covered walkways traverse the main campus, allowing students and faculty to get to most buildings shielded from the weather. The campus is enclosed by an iron fence with brick accents with entrances on East Parkway South, Central Avenue, and Avery Avenue. Security gates have been added to facilities on the northside of the campus in 2023.

Outside organizations housed on campus 
Barret School of Banking

Canale Arena 

Canale Arena, originally called De La Salle Gymnasium, was completed in 1950. At that time, it was the largest indoor arena in the city of Memphis.

The arena was fully renovated in 2004 and has a capacity of 1,000.

Student life

Athletics 

CBU is an NCAA Division II team and a member of the Gulf South Conference. Buccaneer teams include baseball, basketball, cross country, golf, and soccer. Lady Buccaneer teams include basketball, cross country, golf, soccer, softball, and volleyball.

The Lady Buccaneers and Buccaneers have won multiple athletic competitions, including the 2002 Division II women's soccer championship and the 2008 GSC men's basketball championship.
The Men's Soccer Team has won back to back conference titles under coach Clint Browne during the 2011 and 2012 seasons, earning a spot in the NCAA Tournament in 2011.

Greek life 
21% of male students and 24% of female students are members of fraternities and sororities

Campus Greek councils include the Interfraternity Council (IFC), the Panhellenic Council (NPC), and the National Pan-Hellenic Council (NPHC).

Honor societies and professional organizations 
Chapters of a number of honor societies exist at CBU to recognize excellence in academia and leadership. Active honor societies and their specialties include: Alpha Chi (general academic), Beta Beta Beta (biology), the Order of Omega (fraternity and sorority members), Phi Alpha Theta (history), Psi Chi (psychology), Sigma Tau Delta (English), Alpha Psi Omega (theatre), and Tau Beta Pi (engineering).

Professional organizations include: American Institute of Chemical Engineers, American Society of Civil Engineers, American Society of Mechanical Engineers, Institute of Electrical Engineers, Society of Physics Students, and the Student Affiliates of the American Chemical Society.

Notable people

Alumni
 Harry B. Anderson – United States district judge for the Western District of Tennessee
 Charles Bartliff – soccer player and Olympian
 Zach Curlin – college basketball coach at University of Memphis 
 Robert B. Hawley – U.S. representative for Texas's 10th congressional district from 1897 to 1901 and accomplished businessman
 Thomas Aquinas Higgins – senior United States district judge of the United States District Court for the Middle District of Tennessee
 Bill Justis – rock and roll pioneer
 Youssef Naciri – Moroccan professional soccer player (most recently with Harrisburg City Islanders) 
 David Parker – member of the Mississippi State Senate
 Malcolm R. Patterson – governor of Tennessee (1907–1911)
 Chip Saltsman – Republican political strategist and Presidential campaign manager
 Kevin H. Sharp – former United States district judge of the United States District Court for the Middle District of Tennessee
 Ray Crone – former Major League Baseball pitcher who played for the Milwaukee Braves and New York Giants

Faculty (current and former)
 Arun Manilal Gandhi, scholar and peace activist
 Jeffrey Gros, Catholic theologian and ecumenist

See also 
 Eiffel Tower (Paris, Tennessee)
 Christian Brothers High School (Memphis, Tennessee)
 La Salle University

References

External links 
 
 Official athletics website

 
Lasallian colleges and universities
Universities and colleges in Memphis, Tennessee
Educational institutions established in 1871
Universities and colleges accredited by the Southern Association of Colleges and Schools
1871 establishments in Tennessee
Catholic universities and colleges in Tennessee
Association of Catholic Colleges and Universities